Fifteen ships of the French Navy have borne the name Amphitrite, after Amphitrite, a Greek sea goddess.

Ships named Amphitrite 
 ,  a fourth-rank 42/44-gun ship built at Rochefort by the design of Pierre Masson. She was in private service beginning 1698, when she carried a Jesuit mission to Canton under the leadership of Father Joachim Bouvet. She was recommissioned in 1704, and lost to a fire in 1713.
 , a third-rank ship launched October 1700 at Dunkirk as a 50/52. It was later converted to a later 46/48, was renamed Protée in March 1705, and deleted 1722.
 , launched at Bayonne and wrecked 1745, was the lead ship of the class of the same name, a 30-gun design of 1744 by Venard, with 26 x 8-pounder and 4 x 4-pounder guns.
 , a 
 , a corvette
 , a fluyt
 , an aviso
 , a 52-gun frigate, bore the name during her career
 ,  a 44-gun , scuttled in 1809 during the British invasion of Martinique.
 , a  launched October 1814 at Venice, transferred to the Austrian Navy after that year's annexation of Venice, and renamed Anfitrite and later Augusta.
 , an Armide-class frigate, bore the name during the Bourbon Restoration. She was deleted in 1821.
 , a  seventy-four on the First French Empire, bore the name after she was razéed into a 54-gun frigate during the Bourbon Restoration.
 , a lorcha built in Indochina.
  was an  launched in 1914 and struck in 1935.
  was a  launched in 1930 and sunk in 1942.

Ships with similar names 
 a requisitioned trawler. 
 a requisitioned yacht, used as an auxiliary patrol boat.

See also

Notes and references
Notes

References

Bibliography
 
 

French Navy ship names